Hanna Lis, née Kedaj (first married name Smoktunowicz) (born 13 May 1970 in Warsaw) is a Polish TV journalist.

Life
Lis was born in 1970. She started her journalistic career in 1993. For many years she was involved in political and news topics - she led and co-created leading information and journalism programs in 3 popular Polish TV channels. After finishing with Polish National Television at the beginning of 2016, she dealt with lifestyle issues: she was the host of her travel and culinary programme and ran talk-show programmes.

She appeared in the film "Rób swoje ryzyko jest twoje" (2002), was a participant in the "Asia Express" entertainment programme (2016) and she published her cookbook "Mój świat na talerzu" (2019). She is a social activist tweeting about her reaction to coronaviris vaccine.

She was placed on the list of "100 most valuable stars of Polish show-business" of "Forbes Polska" magazine.

References

External links

Photo Gallery

1970 births
Living people
Polish journalists
Polish women journalists
Zecchino d'Oro singers
Anti-vaccination media